Keolari Assembly constituency is one of the 230 Vidhan Sabha (Legislative Assembly) constituencies of Madhya Pradesh state in central India.

It is part of Seoni District.

Members of Legislative Assembly

Election results

2018 results

See also
 Keolari

References

Assembly constituencies of Madhya Pradesh